Trek–Segafredo is a professional road bicycle racing team at UCI WorldTeam level licensed in the United States. Formerly RadioShack–Nissan, in 2014, Trek took over the ownership of the team and its ProTeam License.

History

2011

The team was founded in 2011 under the name of Leopard Trek and officially stylized as LEOPARD TREK with Brian Nygaard and Kim Andersen as team managers. The Schleck brothers were under contract with the Danish team Saxo Bank managed by Bjarne Riis through the end of the 2010 season. Several other  riders followed the Schleck brothers to the new team, including veterans Jens Voigt, Fabian Cancellara and Stuart O'Grady. Subsequent signings included sprinter Daniele Bennati, Davide Viganò and Joost Posthuma.

The team became active at the start of the 2011 cycling season. On December 13, 2010, Jakob Fuglsang revealed that the team would be called Team Leopard, in reference to the management company run by Nygaard. Trek, the bike supplier, confirmed shortly before the team was officially presented that they would be a co-title sponsor, giving the team a full name of "Leopard Trek."

Team rider Wouter Weylandt died as a result of a high-speed, downhill crash during the 2011 Giro d'Italia. The remaining riders of Leopard Trek left the competition at the completion of the following day's stage.

2012

For the 2012 season, the team was renamed RadioShack–Nissan–Trek. The reason is that the American  ceased racing, and their former sponsors joined the Luxembourg Cycling Project. Johan Bruyneel along with several riders from  moved to the new team. The lineup for 2012 was officially confirmed on December 5, 2011. The official UCI name for the team is RadioShack Nissan and it is registered in Luxembourg.

While the UCI ProTeam is now named RadioShack–Nissan–Trek, in December 2011 Leopard also launched a UCI Continental Team, consisting mainly of U23 riders, called Leopard-Trek.

On July 17, 2012, Fränk Schleck was removed from the 2012 Tour de France by the team during the second rest day after his A-sample returned traces of Xipamide. Team RadioShack–Nissan won the team classification of the Tour de France.

Johan Bruyneel stood down as General Manager on October 12 in the aftermath of the publication by the US Anti-Doping Agency of its
"reasoned decision" on the Lance Armstrong doping case.

On December 21, 2012, Nissan announced that they would cease to sponsor the team, with immediate effect.

2013

During the 2013 Tour de France Team RadioShack-Leopard announced that they would not renew Fränk Schleck's contract, leaving him without a team. It also caused a serious and public rift between his brother Andy Schleck and team management, putting his future with the team into doubt.

In September 2013, Chris Horner beat Vincenzo Nibali to win the 2013 Vuelta a España becoming the oldest grand tour winner in history, winning two stages along the way.

2014

On July 3, the team announced that Samsung would become a new minor sponsor of the team.

2015

On December 16, 2015, the team announced that Italian coffee brand Segafredo had committed to a three-year co-title sponsorship effective January 1, 2016, with the team changing name to Trek–Segafredo.

2016

In April the team announced US software company CA Technologies would sponsor the team with immediate effect until the end of the 2017 season. In March 2017 the deal was extended through 2019.

For the 2017 season, the team announced the signings of Alberto Contador, John Degenkolb (until 2019), Koen de Kort (until 2018), Jarlinson Pantano, and Ivan Basso.

2020
The team suspended the 2019 junior road race world champion Quinn Simmons for actions on Twitter, where he used a black hand emoji that Trek–Segafredo considered racially insensitive

Doping
On June 27, 2017, the UCI announced André Cardoso tested positive for erythropoietin in an out-of-competition control on June 18 and has been provisionally suspended. He had been due to support Alberto Contador in his bid for the 2017 Tour de France, with Haimar Zubeldia taking the empty roster place.

In April 2019, Cycling Anti-Doping Foundation confirmed that Jarlinson Pantano had returned an adverse analytical finding for EPO, in a doping test carried out on February 26. Pantano was immediately suspended by the team.

Team roster

Major wins

National & World champions

2011
 Luxembourg Road Race, Fränk Schleck
 Switzerland Road Race, Fabian Cancellara
 Germany Road Race, Robert Wagner
2012
 Luxembourg Road Race, Laurent Didier
 Denmark Time Trial, Jakob Fuglsang
 Switzerland Time Trial, Fabian Cancellara
2013
 New Zealand Road Race, Hayden Roulston
 Switzerland Time Trial, Fabian Cancellara
 Luxembourg Time Trial, Bob Jungels
 Luxembourg Road Race, Bob Jungels
 Belgium Road Race, Stijn Devolder
 Croatia Road Race, Robert Kišerlovski
2014
 New Zealand Road Race, Hayden Roulston
 Belgian Time Trial, Kristof Vandewalle
 Switzerland Time Trial, Fabian Cancellara
 Luxembourg Time Trial, Laurent Didier
 Japan Time Trial, Fumiyuki Beppu
 Austria Road Race, Riccardo Zoidl
 Luxembourg Road Race, Fränk Schleck
2015
 United States Road Race, Matthew Busche 
 Luxembourg Time Trial, Bob Jungels
 Luxembourg Road Race, Bob Jungles
2016
 Australian Road Race, Jack Bobridge
 Switzerland Time Trial, Fabian Cancellara
 Italy Road Race, Giacomo Nizzolo
2017
 Colombian Time Trial, Jarlinson Pantano
 Portugal Road Race, Ruben Guerreiro
 Denmark Road Race, Mads Pedersen
2018
 Ethiopia Time Trial, Tsgabu Grmay
 Ireland Time Trial, Ryan Mullen
 Latvia Time Trial, Toms Skujiņš
2019
 Ireland Time Trial, Ryan Mullen
 Latvia Road Race, Toms Skujiņš
 World Road Race, Mads Pedersen
2020 
 Luxembourg U23 Time Trial, Michel Ries 
2021
 Latvia Time Trial, Toms Skujiņš
 Latvia Road Race, Toms Skujiņš 
 Ireland Time Trial, Ryan Mullen
 Ireland Road Race, Ryan Mullen
2022
 Latvia Time Trial, Toms Skujiņš
 Latvia Road Race, Emīls Liepiņš
 Netherlands Time Trial, Bauke Mollema

References

External links

 

 
UCI WorldTeams
Cycling teams based in Luxembourg
Cycling teams based in the United States
Cycling teams established in 2011
Cycling teams established in 2014
2011 establishments in Luxembourg
2014 establishments in the United States